Rhythm & Hues Studios was an American visual effects and animation company, that received the Academy Award for Best Visual Effects in 1995 for Babe, in 2008 for The Golden Compass, and in 2013 for Life of Pi. It also received four Scientific and Technical Academy Awards.

The company filed for Chapter 11 bankruptcy in early 2013. It was then purchased by an affiliate of Prana Studios, 34x118 Holdings, LLC, but retained the same name.

Rhythm & Hues Studios ceased operations in November 2020 due to various factors including financial pressure caused by the COVID-19 pandemic.

History

1987–2012
Rhythm & Hues Studios was established in Los Angeles, California in 1987 by former employees of Robert Abel and Associates (John Hughes, Pauline Ts'o, Keith Goldfarb, Cliff Boule, Frank Wuts and Charles Gibson). The company used its own proprietary software for its photo-realistic character animation/visual effects—as well as for those that are more stylized.

In 1999, Rhythm & Hues Studios acquired visual effects house VIFX from 20th Century Fox.

By 2012, the company had become a global one, with offices and artists in India (the Mumbai suburb of Malad and HITEC City which is a part of Hyderabad), Malaysia (Cyberjaya just outside Kuala Lumpur), Canada (Vancouver), and Taiwan (Kaohsiung).

2013–2020
Director Ang Lee approached Rhythm & Hues in August 2009 to discuss a planned film adaptation of the fantasy novel Life of Pi. R&H VFX (Visual Effects) Supervisor Bill Westenhofer noted that Lee "knew we had done the lion in the first Narnia movie. He asked, 'Does a digital character look more or less real in 3D?' We looked at each other and thought that was a pretty good question." He also stated that during these meetings, Lee said, "'I look forward to making art with you.' This was really for me one of the most rewarding things I've worked on and the first chance to really combine art with VFX. Every shot was artistic exploration, to make the ocean a character and make it interesting we had to strive to make it as visually stunning as possible."

Rhythm & Hues spent a year on research and development, "building upon its already vast knowledge of CG animation" to develop the tiger. Artist Abdul Rahman in the Malaysian branch underscored the global nature of the effects process, saying that "the special thing about Life of Pi is that it was the first time we did something called remote rendering, where we engaged our cloud infrastructure in Taiwan called CAVE (Cloud Animation and Visual Effects)".

The resulting film, Life of Pi, was released in theaters in November 2012, and was a critical and commercial success. The British Film Institute's Sight & Sound magazine suggested that, "Life of Pi can be seen as the film Rhythm & Hues has been building up to all these years, by taking things they learned from each production from Cats & Dogs to Yogi Bear, integrating their animals in different situations and environments, pushing them to do more, and understanding how all of this can succeed both visually and dramatically."

On February 11, 2013, Rhythm & Hues Studios filed for bankruptcy under Chapter 11, three months after Life of Pi was released. Around 254 people were laid off at that time. This led to a demonstration of nearly 500 VFX artists who protested outside of the 2013 Academy Awards, as Rhythm & Hues was nominated for an Oscar (which it won) for Life of Pi. Inside, during the Oscars, when R&H visual effects supervisor Bill Westenhofer brought up R&H during his acceptance speech for Life of Pi, the microphone was cut off as the music of Jaws slowly took over. This started an uproar among many visual effects industry professionals, changing profile pictures on social media such as Facebook and Twitter to show the green key color, in order to raise awareness of general negative trends in the effects industry. In addition, director Ang Lee was heavily criticized by the community for not acknowledging their work in the effects-laden film in his acceptance speech, despite thanking many other people, and for earlier having complained about the costs of visual effects.

On March 29, 2013, an affiliate of Prana Studios, 34x118 Holdings, LLC, won the bidding on Rhythm and Hues in a bankruptcy auction. The sale was "valued at about $30 million".

After the bankruptcy and sale, Rhythm and Hues continued to work on film, television, and ride-film projects, winning multiple Emmy Awards and a Visual Effects Society award for their work on Game of Thrones.
Rhythm & Hues Studios ceased operations in November 2020 due to various factors including financial pressure caused by the COVID-19 pandemic.

Selected filmography
2022
 RRR

2021
 The King's Man

2019
 Hellboy
 The Boys

2018
 Lost in Space
 Carnival Row
 The Walking Dead (season 8)
 Slender Man
 2.0

2017
 Game of Thrones (season 7)
 The Walking Dead (season 7)
 Midnight, Texas
 The Mist

2016
 Game of Thrones (season 6)
 Skull Island: Reign of Kong

2015
 Game of Thrones (season 5)
 Fear the Walking Dead

2014
 300: Rise of an Empire
 Seventh Son
 Winter's Tale
 Tammy
 Into the Storm
 X-Men: Days of Future Past

2013
 Percy Jackson: Sea of Monsters
 Machete Kills
 R.I.P.D.
 Grown Ups 2
 The Secret Life of Walter Mitty

2012
 The Bourne Legacy
 Big Miracle
 Django Unchained
 Chronicle
 Red Dawn
 The Hunger Games
 This is 40
 Life of Pi
 Snow White and the Huntsman

2011
 Alvin and the Chipmunks: Chipwrecked
 Hop
 Moneyball
 The Cabin in the Woods
 Game of Thrones
 Red Riding Hood
 Mr. Popper's Penguins
 X-Men: First Class

2010
 The A-Team
 Marmaduke
 Charlie St. Cloud
 Percy Jackson & the Olympians: The Lightning Thief
 The Wolfman
 Knight and Day
 Little Fockers
 Hot Tub Time Machine
 Yogi Bear

2009
 Aliens in the Attic
 Ghosts of Girlfriends Past
 Fast & Furious
 The Time Traveler's Wife
 Cirque du Freak: The Vampire's Assistant
 State of Play
 Land of the Lost
 Alvin and the Chipmunks: The Squeakquel
 Night at the Museum: Battle of the Smithsonian

2008
 The Incredible Hulk 
 The Mummy: Tomb of the Dragon Emperor

2007
 The Golden Compass
 Live Free or Die Hard
 I Now Pronounce You Chuck & Larry
 The Seeker: The Dark Is Rising
 The Kingdom
 Alvin and the Chipmunks
 Evan Almighty

2006
 Charlotte's Web
 Garfield: A Tale of Two Kitties
 The Fast and the Furious: Tokyo Drift
 Happy Feet
 Night at the Museum
 Superman Returns
 X-Men: The Last Stand

2005
 The Chronicles of Narnia: The Lion, The Witch and The Wardrobe
 Elektra
 The Longest Yard
 The Skeleton Key
 The Ring 2
 Serenity
 Ice Princess

2004
 Around the World in 80 Days
 Garfield: The Movie
 Friday Night Lights
 The Flight of the Phoenix
 The Chronicles of Riddick
 Scooby-Doo 2: Monsters Unleashed

2003
 The Cat in the Hat
 Daredevil
 The Rundown
 Intolerable Cruelty
 Elf
 The Lord of the Rings: The Return of the King
 X2

2002
 Men in Black II
 Scooby-Doo
 The Ring
 Solaris
 Kung POW!
 Stuart Little 2
 The Sum of All Fears

2001
 Cats & Dogs
 Dr. Dolittle 2
 Along Came a Spider
 Behind Enemy Lines
 One Night at McCool's
 Harry Potter and the Sorcerer's Stone
 The Lord of the Rings: The Fellowship of the Ring
 Planet of the Apes

2000
 How the Grinch Stole Christmas
 Little Nicky
 X-Men
 Fantasia 2000
 Dracula 2000
 Bedazzled
 Frequency
 Battlefield Earth
 The Sixth Day
 The Flintstones in Viva Rock Vegas
 Rugrats in Paris: The Movie
 Hollow Man

1999
 Anna and the King
 The Green Mile
 End of Days
 Mystery Men
 Summer of Sam
 The Story of Us
 Stuart Little

1998
 Babe: Pig in the City
 The Parent Trap
 The Faculty
 Soldier
 Stepmom

1997
 Speed 2: Cruise Control
 Spawn
 MouseHunt
 Batman & Robin

1996
 Kazaam
 The Nutty Professor

1995
 Babe
 Batman Forever
 Ace Ventura: When Nature Calls
 Waterworld

 1994
 The Pagemaster

 1993
 Hocus Pocus
 We're Back! A Dinosaur's Story

 1992
 Stay Tuned

 1991
 Rover Dangerfield
 Flight of the Intruder

 1990
 The Funtastic World of Hanna-Barbera
 Jetsons: The Movie

Awards

Academy Award for Best Visual Effects
 2012: Won: Life of Pi
 2007: Won: The Golden Compass
 1995: Won: Babe

BAFTA Award for Best Special Visual Effects
 2013: Won: Life of Pi
 2007: Won: The Golden Compass, Visual Effects

Emmy Award for Outstanding Special Visual Effects
 2018: Won: Game of Thrones "Beyond the Wall"
 2016: Won: Game of Thrones "Battle Of The Bastards"
 2015: Won: Game of Thrones "The Dance Of Dragons"

Visual Effects Society Award for Outstanding Animated Performance
 2016: Won: Game of Thrones "Battle of the Bastards; Drogon"

See also
 Industrial Light & Magic
 Sony Pictures Imageworks
 Animal Logic
 Weta Digital
 Digital Domain
 Framestore
 Moving Picture Company
 DNEG
 Pacific Data Images
 Blue Sky Studios

References

Further reading and viewing
 Lee, Kevin. "Video essay: The animal menagerie of Rhythm and Hues". Sight & Sound, British Film Institute. December 21, 2012.
 "'Life of Pi's' digital magic". Los Angeles Times, January 17, 2013.
 Zahed, Ramin. "Beyond Talking Pigs and Chipmunks". Animation Magazine, April 2, 2012.
 Life After Pi (2014 documentary)

External links
 Rhythm and Hues

Visual effects companies
Best Visual Effects Academy Award winners
Academy Award for Technical Achievement winners
American animation studios
Computer animation
American companies established in 1987
Entertainment companies established in 1987
Mass media companies established in 1987
Companies that filed for Chapter 11 bankruptcy in 2013
Entertainment companies based in California
Privately held companies based in California
1987 establishments in California
Companies based in Los Angeles
American companies disestablished in 2020
Companies disestablished due to the COVID-19 pandemic
Impact of the COVID-19 pandemic on cinema